Franco Sosa may refer to:

 Franco Sosa (footballer, born 1981), Argentine football defender
 Franco Sosa (footballer, born 1983), Uruguayan football midfielder
 Franco Sosa (footballer, born 1995), Argentine football forward
 Franco Sosa (footballer, born 1999), Argentine football forward